Sir John Hubert Marshall  (19 March 1876, Chester, England – 17 August 1958, Guildford, England) was an English archaeologist who was Director-General of the Archaeological Survey of India from 1902 to 1928. He oversaw the excavations of Harappa and Mohenjo Daro, two of the main cities that comprise the Indus Valley Civilisation.

Personal history and career
Marshall was at school at Dulwich College before King's College, Cambridge, where in 1898 he won the Porson Prize.  He then trained in archaeology at Knossos under Sir Arthur Evans, who was rediscovering the Bronze Age Minoan civilization.

In 1902, the new viceroy of India, Lord Curzon, appointed Marshall as Director-General of Archaeology within the British Indian administration. Marshall modernised the approach to archaeology on that continent, introducing a programme of cataloguing and conservation of ancient monuments and artefacts.

Marshall began the practice of allowing Indians to participate in excavations in their own country. Most of his students were Indian, and so, Marshall gained a reputation for being very sympathetic to Indian nationalism. Marshall agreed with Indian civic leaders and protesters who wanted more self-government for India or even independence for India. Marshall was highly admired by Indians during the time he worked in India. In 1913, he began the excavations at Taxila, which lasted for 21 years. In 1918, he laid the foundation stone for the Taxila Museum, which today hosts many artifacts and one of Marshall's few portraits. He then moved on to other sites, including the Buddhist centres of Sanchi and Sarnath.

His work provided evidence of the antiquity of Indian civilisation, particularly that of the Indus Valley civilization and the Mauryan age (Ashoka's Age). In 1920, Marshall initiated at dig at Harappa with Daya Ram Sahni as director. Mohenjodaro was discovered by R. D. Banerji in 1921, and in 1922, work began there. The results of these efforts, which revealed an ancient culture with its own writing system, were published in the Illustrated London News on 20 September 1924. Scholars linked the artifacts with the ancient civilisation of Sumer in Mesopotamia. Subsequent excavation showed Harappa and Mohenjo-Daro to be sophisticated planned cities with plumbing and baths. But Marshall ignored the stratigraphy of the site, and excavated along regular horizontal lines. This mixed up the artefacts from different stratigraphic layers, causing much valuable information about the context of his findings to be lost forever. This mistake was corrected by R.E.M. Wheeler, who recognised that it was necessary to follow the stratigraphy of the mound rather than dig mechanically along uniform horizontal lines. Also a military precision was brought to archeology by Wheeler.

Marshall also led excavations at the prehistoric Sohr Damb mound near Nal in Baluchistan; a small representative collection of pottery vessels from the site is now in the British Museum.

Retirement and Death
Marshall retired from his post in 1934 and then departed India. He died on 17 August 1958, at his home in Guildford, Surrey, some 28 miles southwest of London.

Honors
Marshall was appointed a Companion of the Order of the Indian Empire (CIE) in June 1910 and knighted in January 1914.

He was awarded an honorary degree, Doctor of Philosophy, by Calcutta University in 1921.

He was elected as a Fellow of the British Academy in 1936.

Publications

 
 Volume 1
 Volume 2

   	

Taxila Achaeological Excavations Vol.III

See also 
 Indus Valley civilization
 R. D. Banerji

References

External links

J. H. Marshall, "The Date of Kanishka", Journal of the Royal Asiatic Society of Great Britain and Ireland, 1914, pp. 973–986.
Sir John Marshall, A Guide to Taxila. Calcutta: Superintendent Government Printing, India, 1918,  archive.org.
"Sir John Hubert Marshall", britannica.com.
A collection of 5000 images from John Marshall's personal archives at Durham University's Oriental Museum

1876 births
1958 deaths
Knights Bachelor
Companions of the Order of the Indian Empire
Alumni of King's College, Cambridge
English archaeologists
People associated with the Indus Valley civilisation
British people in colonial India
Directors General of the Archaeological Survey of India
British Sindhologists
19th-century archaeologists
20th-century archaeologists
Fellows of the British Academy
Archaeologists of South Asia